Mark Sandford is a Canadian international lawn bowler.

Bowls career
Sandford has represented Canada at two Commonwealth Games, in the pairs at the 1998 Commonwealth Games and in the triples at the 2006 Commonwealth Games.

He has won three medals at the Asia Pacific Bowls Championships. He has won three Canadian National titles.

References

Canadian male bowls players
Living people
Bowls players at the 1998 Commonwealth Games
Bowls players at the 2006 Commonwealth Games
Year of birth missing (living people)